The 1955 Ottawa Rough Riders finished in 4th place in the IRFU with a 3–9 record and failed to qualify for the playoffs for the fourth consecutive season.

Preseason

Regular season

Standings

Schedule

References

Ottawa Rough Riders seasons
1955 Canadian football season by team